Deonce Terrell Whitaker (born October 25, 1978) is a former running back in the Canadian Football League. He played for the BC Lions, Montreal Alouettes and Winnipeg Blue Bombers. He played college football for the San Jose State Spartans.

Born in Las Vegas, Nevada, Whitaker graduated from Rancho Cucamonga High School in Rancho Cucamonga, California in 1997.

References

1978 births
Living people
American players of Canadian football
American football running backs
Canadian football running backs
BC Lions players
Montreal Alouettes players
Winnipeg Blue Bombers players
San Jose State Spartans football players
Sportspeople from Las Vegas
Players of American football from California
Players of American football from Nevada
People from Rialto, California